Black Forest Games GmbH is a German video game developer based in Offenburg. The company was founded in July 2012 by a team of 40 staff members, including chief executive officer Andreas Speer, previously employed by Spellbound Entertainment, which filed for insolvency earlier that year. As of August 2017, it is a subsidiary of THQ Nordic. As of June 2019, the company employs 66 people.

History 
Following the release of Arcania: Fall of Setarrif, the game's developer, Spellbound Entertainment, filed for insolvency in March 2012. Upon completion, on 13 July 2012, it was announced that Black Forest Games was founded in Offenburg as a successor to Spellbound, employing 40 of the Spellbound's former 65 staff. Under these 40 was most of the former management, including chief executive officer Andreas Speer.

In July 2012, Black Forest Games started a Kickstarter campaign for a new installment of The Great Giana Sisters tentatively titled Project Giana, stating "Project Giana is the grandchild of The Great Giana Sisters". The game features music from The Great Giana Sisters original composer Chris Huelsbeck and the Swedish "SID metal" band Machinae Supremacy. Giana Sisters: Twisted Dreams was released on October 23, 2012 for PC with later releases on Xbox Live Arcade, PlayStation Network, and Nintendo eShop.

Rogue Stormers was revealed at the Game Developers Conference 2010, in San Francisco under the project name RavensDale, although it has been in development since 2007. After an unsuccessful attempt on Kickstarter in 2013 the game was put on hold. In a second attempt in early 2014 the game, then known as DieselStormers, was successfully funded on Kickstarter and went to Steam early access in July 2014.

Due to a trademark registration of DieselStormers by Diesel S.p.A.'s successful trademark lawsuit, Black Forest Games decided to change the name from DieselStormers to Rogue Stormers. Fade to Silence was announced at The Game Awards 2017. It is a survival game set in a snow-covered forest, requiring the player to collect resources, build a refuge, and recruit others as followers to survive. The game entered early access on Steam on 14 December 2017, and had its full release on 30 April 2019 for Microsoft Windows, PlayStation 4, and Xbox One. The game was published by THQ Nordic.

On 7 June 2019, THQ Nordic announced a remake of the 2005 science fiction game Destroy All Humans! is in development at Black Forest Studios, set for a release in 2020 for Microsoft Windows, PlayStation 4, and Xbox One. The remake will feature content that was cut from the original release developed by Pandemic Studios. The game was officially announced in June 2019. An extended gameplay demo was launched at E3 2019. In August 2019, Google announced that the game will also be available for Stadia.

Games developed

References

External links 
 

2017 mergers and acquisitions
Companies based in Baden-Württemberg
German companies established in 2012
THQ Nordic divisions and subsidiaries
Video game companies established in 2012
Video game companies of Germany
Video game development companies
Offenburg